The 1979–80 Alcorn State Braves basketball team represented Alcorn State University during the 1979–80 NCAA Division I men's basketball season. The Braves, led by head coach Davey Whitney, played their home games at the Davey Whitney Complex and were members of the Southwestern Athletic Conference. They finished the season 28–2, 8–0 in SWAC. They won the SWAC tournament to receive an automatic bid to the NCAA tournament as No. 8 seed in the Midwest region. The Braves defeated No. 9 seed South Alabama, 70–62, and then played No. 1 seed LSU tough before falling, 98–88.

Roster

Schedule and results

|-
!colspan=9 style=| Regular season

|-
!colspan=9 style=| SWAC tournament

|-
!colspan=9 style=| NCAA tournament

References

Alcorn State Braves basketball seasons
Alcorn State
Alcorn State